Josy Rongoni (born 18 December 1932) is a Luxembourgian footballer. He played in two matches for the Luxembourg national football team from 1956 to 1957.

References

External links
 

1932 births
Living people
Luxembourgian footballers
Luxembourg international footballers
Place of birth missing (living people)
Association footballers not categorized by position